Charles Wrack (28 December 1899 – 13 April 1979) was an English professional footballer who played as a defender.

References

1899 births
1979 deaths
People from Boston, Lincolnshire
English footballers
Association football defenders
Boston West End F.C. players
Boston Town F.C. players
Cleethorpes Town F.C. players
Grimsby Town F.C. players
Hull City A.F.C. players
Louth Town F.C. players
English Football League players